Bandros or Bandung Tour Bus is a tour bus which operates in Bandung, West Java, Indonesia. It is used by tourists in Bandung City.
The bus was unveiled by the Mayor of Bandung, Ridwan Kamil, on New Year's Eve 2014, and on February 18, 2018  it was announced that a tour bus will serve the city's. A local tour leader will accompany tourists on the bus. Bandros is managed by two parties: the Department of Transportation in  Bandung (which is associated with the  Regional Revenue and Expenditures Budget) and Mang Dudung which forms part of Corporate Social Responsibility. Buses have a capacity of 22 people. There are six buses operated by the Corporate Social Responsibility division, and 12 buses operated by the Regional Revenue and Expenditures Budget which is managed by the BLUD UPT Angkutan Department of Transportation in Bandung.

History 
The existence bandros as tour bus terraced begins with a plan of Mayor Bandung, Ridwan Kamil when he was newly elected mayor in 2013 and to improve the tourism sector, which is one of wheel drive economic mainstay and Bandung. According to the plan, the bus will be at each hotel to escort tourists to tourist attractions in the city of Bandung and its surroundings.
In addition to delivering tourists to tourist attractions in Bandung, a tour bus that is designed with a comfortable and attractive is expected to reduce the use of car private so that it can reduce the congestion that occurs in the city

This plan is then received from the Telkomsel are willing to fund the first units of a tour bus in the city of Bandung through the Corporate Social Responsibility. In addition, the city government is also holding an open competition to name the tour bus through social networking Twitter. the competition was won by Erry Pamungkas who named this tour bus with bandros name, stands on the Bandung Tour Bus. The name itself comes from the name bandros one of the typical foods Parahyangan so the name is increasingly making a tour bus in the city of Bandung interesting. Finally, on 31 December 2013, coinciding with the New Year's Eve 2014, the Mayor officially launched Ridwan Kamil bandros tour bus.

Fares 
Fares are relatively cheap, only Rp. 20,000 for one trip and Rp. 40,000 for multiple trips with an average route above 20 km.

There are two payment methods :

 Cash (Customers can pay using local currency cash in Rupiah)
 QRIS (Customers can pay by scanning the QR code using any supporting QRIS payment app)

Route 

 Blue Route will drive around from Alun-alun Bandung, to Cibaduyut, Taman Leuwi Panjang, Museum Sri Baduga, Alun-alun Regol,  Buah Batu and back to Alun Alun.
 Yellow Route start from Taman Dewi Sartika, Gasibu, Pusdai, Taman Superhero, Taman Foto, Gedung Merdeka, Alun-alun Bandung, Braga and back to Taman Dewi Sartika.
 Purple Route going through the streets near Taman Lansia, Gasibu, to Taman Cikapayang, Alun-alun Ujungberung, Museum Geologi, Pusdai and back to Taman Lansia.
 Green Route which will take tourists to Chinatown, start from Alun Alun to Pasir Kaliki, Alun-alun Cicendo, Karang Setra, UPI, GOR Padjadjaran and back to Alun Alun.
 Pink Route which will pass from Gasibu, start from Taman Lansia menuju Taman Pasupati (Taman Jomblo), Teras Cikapayang, Teras Cihampelas, dan kembali ke Taman Lansia.

Facilities 
One of the facilities provided in the bus is a tool GPS so that tourists know where his position was.
in addition to GPS, the bus is also equipped with a data center and information making it easier for tourists to access the ins and outs of the city of Bandung.

Physically, bandros has a length of 747 cm and 315 cm high and 210 cm wide. At the bottom level, there are a number of round seat and a lounger with a capacity of 20 passengers.  The driver and conductor bandros be clothed with a special design that makes tourists are increasingly interested in using these buses.

References

External links 

 
 

Bandung
Transport in West Java